The Suzhou Zoo is a zoo in Suzhou, China. In 2015, a female Yangtze giant softshell turtle was artificially inseminated at the zoo in an attempt to save the species from extinction.

References

Tourist attractions in Suzhou
Zoos in China